Buckingham Park may refer to:

 Buckingham Park, Buckinghamshire, United Kingdom
 Buckingham Park, California, United States
 Buckingham Park, New Jersey, United States